This article is about the weapons used in the First Indochina War that involved the North Vietnam or Việt Minh (Army: People's Army of Vietnam (PAVN), Lao Issara (1945–1949), Pathet Lao (1949–1954), Lao People's Armed Forces (LPAF), Khmer Issarak or United Issarak Front (1950–1954)), Japanese volunteers, the State of Vietnam (1949–1954) and the French Fourth Republic (Army: French Armed Forces (Forces armées Françaises) or French Indochina, French Far East Expeditionary Corps (Corps Expéditionnaire Français en Extrême-Orient (CEFEO)), Kingdom of Cambodia (1946–1954), Kingdom of Laos (1947–1954), Vietnamese National Army (VNA)).

From Vietnam supported by Soviet Union, East Germany and China

From France and State of Vietnam supported by United States

Weapons of the North Vietnam (Việt Minh)

Pistol 

 Nambu Type 14
 Colt M1911
 Tokarev TT-33
 Inglis Hi-Power
 M1935A
 Mle 1892 revolver

Rifles

Bolt-action rifles 

 Enfield M1917 (Captured from France, State of Vietnam and Chinese supply)
 Lee–Enfield rifle (Captured from France, State of Vietnam and bought secretly from Malaysia and Thailand)
 Lebel Model 1886 rifle (captured from France, State of Vietnam)
 Type 99/38 rifle (Captured From Japan)
 Hanyang 88 (Secretly bought and supplied from China)
 Kar 98
 Mosin–Nagant M1891
 MAS-36 (Captured from France)
 M1903 Springfield (Either Captured from France or given by American aid in World War 2)

Semi-automatic rifles 
 M1 Carbine (Captured from France)

Automatic weapons

Submachine guns 

 Lanchester submachine gun (Bought secretly from Malaysia and Thailand)
 Madsen M-50 (Captured from France)
 Mat-49 (Captured from France)
 PPSH 41
 PPS submachine gun
 MP-40 (Captured from France)
 Thompson submachine gun (Captured from France)

Medium machine guns 

 PM M1910 (Soviet Union supply)
 Degtyaryov machine gun
 ZB vz. 26
 FM 24/29 light machine gun (Captured from France)
 BAR (Captured from France)
 Vickers machine gun (Captured from France)

Heavy machine guns 

 Hotchkiss M1929 machine gun (Captured from France)
 Type 3 heavy machine gun (Captured from Japan)
 Type 92 machine gun (Captured from Japan)
 DSHK (Soviet Supply)

Mortars 

 Brandt 120 mm M1945 (Captured from France)
 Lance Grenades 50 mm M1937 (Captured from France)
 M1 mortar (Captured from France)
 M2 4.2-inch mortar (Captured from France)
 Type 97 81 mm infantry mortar (Captured from Japan)
 Vietnamese 50,8 mm, 60 mm, 81 mm, 120 mm and 187 mm mortar

Anti-tank weapons 
 M3 37 mm anti-tank gun (Captured from France)
 Ordnance QF 6-pounder (Captured from France)
 PIAT (Captured from France)
 Type 94 37 mm anti-tank gun
 Vietnamese 60 mm, 120 mm and 185 mm rocket launcher
 Vietnamese SS recoilless rifle
 Vietnamese SSAT 53

Anti-aircraft weapons 
 Bofors 40 mm (Captured from France)
 Hotchkiss M1929 machine gun (Captured from France)
 Oerlikon 20 mm (Captured from France)
 Schneider 75 mm M1913, M1915 and M1917 AA gun (Captured from France in fort Lang)
 Type 88 75 mm AA gun (Captured from Japan)
 Type 98 20 mm AA machine cannon (Captured from Japan)

Artillery 

 75 mm M1897 field cannon (Captured from France)
 H-6 Multiple rocket launcher (Chinese supply)
 Ordnance QF 3.7-inch mountain howitzer (Captured from France)
 Schneider 65 mm M1906 mountain cannon (Captured from France)
 Schneider 105 mm L M1936 field cannon (Limited use, captured from France)
 Type 38 75 mm field cannon (Captured from Japan and called Son Phao by the Vietnamese)
 Type 92 battalion cannon (Captured from Japan)

References

First Indochina War
First Indochina War
First Indochina War